Frederick H. Trimble was an American architect in Central Florida from the early 1900s through the 1920s. He worked in the Colonial Revival, Spanish Colonial Revival and Prairie Style.

Buildings listed on the National Register of Historic Places include:
Fellsmere Public School, 22 S. Orange St. Fellsmere, FL Trimble, Frederick H. 
Luther F. Tilden House, 940 Tildenville School Rd. Winter Garden, FL Trimble,F.H. 
Vero Theatre, 2036 14th Ave. Vero Beach, FL Trimble,F.H.
Lake Wales Historic Residential District, Roughly bounded by the Seaboard Airline RR grade, CSX RR tracks, E. Polk Ave., S. and N. Lake Shore Blvds. Lake Wales, FL Trimble, F.H.

Background 
Frederick Homer Trimble was born on June 2, 1878 and died August 13, 1934.  His parents were Andrew Hill Trimble and Cynthia Ann Wright.  Fred was one of their thirteen children: ten boys and three girls.

Frederick Homer Trimble graduated from Morningside College in Sioux City, Iowa, and was appointed by the Methodist Church to serve as the first industrial missionary to Foochow, China in 1905, putting to use his schooling in architecture and civil engineering.  While on furlough, he married Rena Nellie Bowker, who then also went to China as a missionary in 1906.  While in China Trimble served as superintendent of construction of Hwa Nan College, the Woman's College of South China.

Spanish Colonial Revival

Trimble began his architectural career in the United States in Fellsmere, Florida.  
Trimble was noted for his design of school buildings starting with the Fellsmere School (1915). He designed more than 50 schools in Florida. In 1918-1919, Trimble employed Ida Annah Ryan as a designing architect.
 
Trimble's was one of only ten architectural firms listed in the Orlando phone directory in 1926, the others being: Frank L. Bodine, Fred E. Field, David Hyer, Murry S. King, George E. Krug, Howard M. Reynolds, Ryan and Roberts (Ida Annah Ryan and Isabel Roberts) and Percy P. Turner. This group of architects was quite intentional about creating a style of architecture in Central Florida suited to the region.  Here is how they described it in an article from The Florida Circle of May 1924:

"Just as architects of old created styles to harmonize with their environment, so have the architects of Florida been creating, from native motifs, a style that is carefully adapted to the climatic conditions and surroundings of the state.  This style has an individuality all its own and should have a fitting name to express its origins . . .  The Florida Association of Architects will give a prize of $25.00 for the name selected."

This contest was to conclude in November 1924 and the winning name announced thereafter.

Florida Southern College
In 1921, Trimble created a master plan for the campus of Florida Southern College in Lakeland, based upon Thomas Jefferson's campus plan for the University of Virginia.    Frank Lloyd Wright’s later design for the campus was influenced by Trimble’s concepts, especially the domed central feature which Wright translated into a water dome, finally made operational in 2008.

Architectural Work – Partial Listing

Florida

 “Meadow Marsh” Luther F. Tilden House, 940 Tildenville School Road, Winter Garden – 1900 (renovations and additions to the 1877 house) – Classical Revival – added to the National Register of Historic Places in 1995
 Farmer's Bank (Vero Furniture Mart), Osceola Boulevard (20th Street) and Seminole Avenue (14th Avenue), Vero Beach – 1925 – Spanish Mission style  
 Fellsmere Public School, 22 South Orange Street, Fellsmere – 1915-16 – Prairie Style
 Delaney Elementary School (now William Beardall Senior Center), Delaney and Gore Streets, Orlando – 1920
 Carey Hand Funeral Home, 36 West Pine Street, Orlando – 1920 – Romano-Tuscan style
 Montverde Academy, Montverde - before 1923
 Okeechobee High School, Okeechobee - before 1923
 Lake Worth High School, Lake Worth - before 1923
 Stuart High School, Stuart - before 1923
 St. Joseph Catholic School of Orlando - before 1923
 Orlando High School - 1921
 Ocoee High School - 1921
 Gulf High School, New Port Richey – 1922 – Prairie Style
 School, Sanford - 1922
 Old Lake County Courthouse, Tavares (with Alan J. MacDonough) - 1923 
 Royal Park Inn, Royal Park Subdivision, Vero Beach – 1924 – Spanish Colonial Revival
 Florida Theatre (now Vero Theatre), 2036 14th Avenue, Vero Beach – 1924 – Mediterranean Revival – added to the National Historic Register in 1992
 Farmer's Bank (Vero Furniture Mart), Osceola Boulevard (20th Street) and Seminole Avenue (14th Avenue), Vero Beach – 1925 – Spanish Mission style 
 Orange Apartments, 1426 Nineteenth Place, Vero Beach - c. 1925 – Spanish Colonial Revival
 Joseph-Reynolds Hall, Florida Southern College, Lakeland 
 Florida Southern College, Campus Master Plan, Lakeland - 1925
 Blackstone Hotel (Orlando) (later Fort Gatlin Hotel) (demolished), 545 North Orange Avenue, Orlando – 1926 – Spanish Colonial Style
 Sebring High School and Auditorium, Sebring - circa 1928

Illinois 
 Methodist Hospital of Central Illinois, Peoria (consulting architect)- 1917

References 

20th-century American architects
Morningside University alumni
People from Orlando, Florida
1878 births
1934 deaths
Architecture firms based in Florida